Baader Meinhof is a 1996 album by Luke Haines, under the pseudonym Baader Meinhof. The name is taken from two of the main members of the Red Army Faction, Andreas Baader and Ulrike Meinhof, and the album, composed of 10 tracks, tells the history of group, since the ideas that might have inspired the group (in the first track, there's a quote from the student movement leader Rudi Dutschke: "Rudi said 'we got to be wise and we got to get armed'"), their first actions ("Burn Warehouse Burn"), their travel to Jordan ("Meet Me at the Airport"), their capture, the hijacking of a Lufthansa airplane by the members of the "second generation" of the RAF, in 1977 (one of the events that marked the German Autumn) ("Mogadishu").

In 2014, British independent record label 3 Loop Music re-released the album on heavyweight 180gsm vinyl and as an Expanded CD Edition which included four remixes from a previously unreleased EP.

Reception

In a retrospective review, Jake Kennedy of Record Collector considered it one of Haines' best releases that "stands the test of time remarkably well".

Track listing
"Baader Meinhof" – 3:01
"Meet Me at the Airport" – 2:50
"There's Gonna Be an Accident" – 3:25
"Mogadishu" – 3:38
"Theme from "Burn Warehouse Burn"" – 1:37
"GSG - 29" – 2:58
"....It's a Moral Issue" – 3:24
"Back on the Farm" – 3:53
"Kill Ramirez" – 3:26
"Baader Meinhof" – 2:56

References

1996 albums
Luke Haines albums
Hut Records albums
Albums produced by Phil Vinall
Cultural depictions of the Red Army Faction